Christopher Barnard may refer to:

 Chris Barnard (footballer) (born 1947), Welsh footballer
 Christopher J. Barnard (1952–2007), British evolutionary biologist